Marion Duff Hanks (October 13, 1921 – August 5, 2011) was a general authority of the Church of Jesus Christ of Latter-day Saints (LDS Church) from 1953 until his death.

Early life
Hanks was born in Salt Lake City, Utah. As a young man he served in the Northern States Mission of the LDS Church, which was headquartered in Chicago. He was in the United States Navy during World War II and received a J.D. from the University of Utah. Prior to his call as a general authority, Hanks worked as an instructor in the Church Educational System. Hanks married Maxine Christensen and became the father of five children.

General authority
Hanks served in the Presidency of the Seventy twice following the 1976 reconstitution of the First Quorum of the Seventy. Previously, he also served on the First Council of the Seventy from 1953 to 1968 and as an Assistant to the Quorum of the Twelve Apostles from 1968 to 1976. During a three-year period in the early 1960s, Hanks was the president of the LDS Church mission in England; among the missionaries in his mission were Jeffrey R. Holland and Quentin L. Cook, who both later became apostles of the church.

In the mid-1970s, Hanks served as managing director of the church's Melchizedek Priesthood MIA. From 1982 to 1985, he was the president of the Salt Lake Temple. In the 1970s, Hanks was also a member of the Church Board of Education. In October 1992, Hanks was given general authority emeritus status.

Outside of his formal church responsibilities, Hanks preferred to be referred to as "Duff,” his middle name.

Other activities
Hanks was a member of the President's Council on Physical Fitness and Sports (for which he received its Distinguished Service Award) and the President's Citizens Advisory Committee on Children and Youth. In 1988, Hanks was awarded the Silver Buffalo Award by the Boy Scouts of America (BSA). Hanks served for a time as a member of the National Council of the BSA.  He also served as a member of the boards of Weber State University and Southern Utah University.

Hanks wrote the words to "That Easter Morn", which is hymn number 198 in the LDS Church's 1985 hymnal.

Death
Hanks died at the age of 89. At the time of his death, Hanks was the oldest living former member of the First Quorum of the Seventy and the second-oldest emeritus general authority after Eldred G. Smith.

Notes

External links

1921 births
2011 deaths
20th-century American lawyers
20th-century Mormon missionaries
American Latter Day Saint hymnwriters
American Mormon missionaries in England
American Mormon missionaries in the United States
American general authorities (LDS Church)
Assistants to the Quorum of the Twelve Apostles
Church Educational System instructors
Latter Day Saints from Utah
Lawyers from Salt Lake City
Members of the First Quorum of the Seventy (LDS Church)
Mission presidents (LDS Church)
People from Salt Lake City
Presidents of the Seventy (LDS Church)
S.J. Quinney College of Law alumni
Songwriters from Utah
Temple presidents and matrons (LDS Church)